Erruca sanguipuncta is a moth of the family Erebidae. It was described by Herbert Druce in 1898. It is found in Ecuador.

References

Arctiinae
Moths described in 1898